The Israelite Seminary of France (French: Le séminaire israélite de France (SIF)) also known as the Central Rabbinical School of France (L'école centrale rabbinique de France), is a Rabbinical school that trains Orthodox rabbis in France. Founded in Metz in 1829 as the Central Rabbinical School of Metz, it moved to Paris in 1859, where it is based in the city's 5th arrondissement. The school is connected with the Israelite Central Consistory of France, one of the major bodies of Orthodox Judaism in France.

History 
In 1820, discussions began over the creation of a rabbinical school in France. On August 21, 1829, a seminary was requested by the Central Consistory and granted by ministerial order. The buildings were inaugurated on June 1, 1830 at 47 Rue d'Arsenal in Metz. Metz was at that point an important center of the Jewish community. On March 22, 1831, an order of King Louis Philippe I allowed for state financing for the school.

On July 1, 1859, the school moved to Paris after a royal decree by Empress Eugenie. It took the name Séminaire israélite. It was temporarily set up at the Derenbourg-Springer Institution at 10 Rue de Parc-Royal in the 3e arrondissement of Paris, and later at 57 Boulevard Richard-Lenoir in the 11e arrondissement.

The Consistory bought 1500 square meters of land at 9 Rue Vauquelin in the Latin Quarter of the 5e arrondissement, the center of French intellectual life. David Bloqué, an Alsatian living in Paris, gave a generous donation to the school. The student-rabbis moved to the Latin Quarter location on April 11, 1881. An oratory was inaugurated during Rosh Hashanah 1883.

The 1905 law on the separation of Church and State ended the state's financial contribution to the school. The school kept the name Séminaire israélite de France (SIF), while the rabbinical school also became known as the l’École rabbinique de France.

During the Second world war, the seminary moved to Vichy France for a few months in 1940. From 1941 to July 1942, it was located in Chamalières, near Clermont-Ferrand. In October 1942, it moved to Lyon. The school was dissolved in 1943 and functioned underground until 1945. After the Liberation of France, it resumed its activities.

Mission 
Since its founding in 1830, the seminary has had over 400 students, with over 300 graduating with a diploma. Its primary goal is to produce rabbis, though for many years some graduates have become chanters or Hazzanim. Of the nineteen Chief Rabbis of France (including interim) since the creation of the role, the last nine Chief Rabbis were ordained by the Seminary.

The Seminary library specializes in the Bible, the Talmud, Halacha, Rabbinic literature, Talmudic law, homilies, and in the history and sociology of Judaism. It is a part of the European Network of Libraries of Judaica and Hebraica, which they founded in July 2004 with the library of the Alliance Israélite Universelle and the Medem Library, House of Yiddish Culture. The network is associated with the Bibliothèque nationale de France.

Directors 

 1830–1837 : Lion Mayer (Judah Meir) Lambert,
 1837–1856 : Mayer Lazard
 1856–1890 : Isaac Léon Trenel
 1890–1917 : Joseph Lehmann,
 1919–1931 : Jules Bauer
 1932–1949 : Maurice Liber
 1949–1951 : Ernest Gugenheim, directeur par interim
 1951–1977 : Henri Schilli
 1977-1977 : Ernest Gugenheim (quelques jours avant son décès)
 1977–1991 : Emmanuel Chouchena
 1992–2012 : Michel Gugenheim
 2013– : Olivier Kaufmann

Notable alumni, professors and administrators 

 Gilles Bernheim (1952–), Chief Rabbi of France (2009–2013)
 Arsène Darmesteter (1846–1888), student for a short period, later a professor
 Hartwig Derenbourg (1844–1908), professor of Arabic and Semitic languages
 Joseph Derenbourg (1811–1895), arabisant, étudiant et/ou enseignant
 Josy Eisenberg (1933–2017), pas de poste de rabbin, responsable de l'émission de télévision La Source de vie
 David Feuerwerker (1912–1980), rabbin de Brive-la-Gaillarde, grand-rabbin de Lyon, rue des Tournelles (Paris), rue Chasseloup-Laubat (Paris), Beth din (cour rabbinique) et Vaad Haïr de Montréal (Québec, Canada)
 Michel Gugenheim (1950–), rabbin la synagogue Michkenot Israël (Paris), grand-rabbin de Paris, co-grand-rabbin de France par intérim (2013–2014) (avec Olivier Kaufmann)
 René Gutman (1950–), rabbin de Reims, Besançon, grand-rabbin de Bruxelles (Belgique), grand-rabbin de Strasbourg et du Bas-Rhin
 Paul Janet (1823–1899), professeur de philosophie
 Zadoc Kahn (1839–1905), grand-rabbin de France (1889–1905)
 Haïm Korsia (1963–), rabbin Le Mans (pour les fêtes), Reims, grand-rabbin de France (2014–)
 Mayer Lambert (1863–1930), orientalist
 Emmanuel Lévinas (1906–1995), philosophe, étudiant et/ou enseignant
 Alfred Lévy (1840–1919), grand-rabbin de France (1907–1919)
 Sylvain Lévi (1863–1935), indianiste, étudiant et/ou enseignant
 Isidore Loeb (1839–1892), professeur d'histoire du judaïsme (1878–1890)
 Georges Loinger, (1910–2018), surveillant général en 1935
 Samuel Naumbourg (1817–1880), professeur de musique liturgique
 Isaïe Schwartz (1876–1952), rabbin intérimaire à Marseille, rabbin de Bayonne, grand-rabbin de Bordeaux, grand-rabbin de Strasbourg et du Bas-Rhin, grand-rabbin de France (1939–1952)
 Joseph Haïm Sitruk (1944–2016), rabbin de Strasbourg, grand-rabbin de Marseille, grand-rabbin de France (1987–2008)
 Georges Vajda (1908–1981) historien de la pensée juive médiévale, professeur de Bible et de théologie juive
 Roger Winsbacher (1928–2012), rabbin de Saint-Louis (Haut-Rhin), Obernai (Bas-Rhin), synagogue de rite polonais de Strasbourg (Adath Israel)

Bibliography 

 Jules Bauer, L'École rabbinique de France 1830–1930, PUF, Paris, 1930.
 Roger Berg, Histoire du rabbinat français (XVIe-XXe siècle), collection Patrimoines-Judaïsme, Éditions du Cerf, Paris, 1992, .
  Robert K. Wittman et David Kinney. The Devil's Diary. Alfred Rosenberg and the Stolen Secrets of the Third Reich. Harper & Collins, New York, 2016.

References

External links 

 Séminaire israélite de France. Historique : de 1830 à nos jours.
 Archives du Séminaire israélite de France.
 du Séminaire israélite de France.

5th arrondissement of Paris
Jews and Judaism in Paris
Orthodox Judaism in France